Scotts Bluff County is a county on the western border of the U.S. state of Nebraska. As of the 2020 United States Census, the population was 36,084. Its county seat is Gering, and its largest city is Scottsbluff.

Scotts Bluff County is included in the Scottsbluff, NE Micropolitan Statistical Area.

In the Nebraska license plate system, Scotts Bluff County is represented by the prefix 21, since the county had the twenty-first-largest number of registered vehicles registered when the state's license-plate system was established in 1922.

History
The county is named for a prominent bluff that served as a landmark for 19th-century pioneers traveling along the Oregon Trail. Scotts Bluff was named for Hiram Scott, a Rocky Mountain Fur Company trapper who died nearby around 1828.  Washington Irving claimed that, after being injured and abandoned, Scott had crawled sixty miles only to perish near the bluff that now bears his name. The bluff is now managed by the National Park Service as Scotts Bluff National Monument.

The town of Gering was founded at the base of the bluff in 1887, and the city of Scottsbluff was founded across the North Platte River in 1900. Joined by the river, the former transportation highway, the two cities now form Nebraska's 7th-largest urban area.

Transportation
Scotts Bluff County Airport (BFF) is Nebraska's third-busiest airport in terms of passenger boardings.

Geography
Scotts Bluff County is on the west side of Nebraska. Its west boundary line abuts the east boundary line of the state of Wyoming. The North Platte River flows east-southeastward through the upper central part of the county. The county's terrain consists of arid rolling hills, about half of which is dedicated to agriculture. The county's lands slope to the east-southeast.

Major highways
  U.S. Highway 26
  Nebraska Highway 29
  Nebraska Highway 71
  Nebraska Highway 92

Adjacent counties

 Sioux County – north
 Box Butte County – northeast
 Morrill County – east
 Banner County – south
 Goshen County, Wyoming – west

Protected areas

 Kiowa State Wildlife Management Area
 Lake Minatare State Recreation Area
 North Platte National Wildlife Refuge
 Scotts Bluff National Monument
 Wildcat Hills State Recreation Area

Demographics

As of the 2000 United States Census, there were 36,951 people, 14,887 households, and 10,167 families in the county. The population density was 50 people per square mile (19/km2). There were 16,119 housing units at an average density of 22 per square mile (8/km2). The racial makeup of the county was 87.58% White, 0.27% Black or African American, 1.88% Native American, 0.57% Asian, 0.04% Pacific Islander, 8.02% from other races, and 1.63% from two or more races. 17.19% of the population were Hispanic or Latino of any race. 39.5% were of German, 8.6% English and 6.8% Irish ancestry.

There were 14,887 households, out of which 31.50% had children under the age of 18 living with them, 54.20% were married couples living together, 10.70% had a female householder with no husband present, and 31.70% were non-families. 27.80% of all households were made up of individuals, and 12.80% had someone living alone who was 65 years of age or older. The average household size was 2.44 and the average family size was 2.97.

The county population contained 25.90% under the age of 18, 8.40% from 18 to 24, 25.40% from 25 to 44, 23.00% from 45 to 64, and 17.20% who were 65 years of age or older. The median age was 38 years. For every 100 females there were 91.20 males. For every 100 females age 18 and over, there were 88.30 males.

The median income for a household in the county was $32,016, and the median income for a family was $38,932. Males had a median income of $30,317 versus $20,717 for females. The per capita income for the county was $17,355. About 11.00% of families and 14.50% of the population were below the poverty line, including 22.00% of those under age 18 and 8.70% of those age 65 or over.

Economy
The economy of Scotts Bluff County is based on agriculture, with the primary crops being sugar beets, corn, and beans.

Communities

Cities

 Gering (county seat)
 Minatare
 Mitchell
 Terrytown
 Scottsbluff

Villages

 Henry
 Lyman
 McGrew
 Melbeta
 Morrill

Unincorporated communities
 Bradley
 Haig

Precincts

 Castle Rock
 Dewey Tabor
 East Winters Creek
 Fanning
 Ford
 Funston
 Gering
 Highland
 Kiowa
 Mitchell
 Roubadeau
 West Winters Creek

Politics
Scotts Bluff County voters have been reliably Republican for decades. In no national election since 1936 has the county selected the Democratic Party candidate (as of 2020).

See also
 Lake Minatare Lighthouse
 National Register of Historic Places listings in Scotts Bluff County, Nebraska

References

 
1888 establishments in Nebraska
Populated places established in 1888